Rodney Darrell Scott (born October 16, 1953), nicknamed "Cool Breeze", is a former infielder in Major League Baseball. Primarily used as a second baseman and shortstop, Scott also played third base, designated hitter and outfield during his eight-year career.

Scott was known mostly for his speed and stole 63 bases during the 1980 campaign, which ranked him third in the National League. He finished with 205 career stolen bases.

Scott was involved in five trades during his career, including three in the span of two weeks. From March 19–29 of 1978, Scott would find himself traded from the Montreal Expos to the Texas Rangers, Oakland Athletics, then finally the Chicago Cubs. The Cubs then traded Scott back to the Expos by the end of the year.

Scott finished his career with the Expos, although he never played any games for them after they signed him as a free agent for the 1983 season.

See also
 List of Major League Baseball annual triples leaders
 List of Major League Baseball career stolen bases leaders

External links
, or Retrosheet, or Venezuelan Winter League
Official Rodney Scott website

1953 births
Living people
African-American baseball players
Águilas del Zulia players
American expatriate baseball players in Canada
American expatriate baseball players in Mexico
Angeles de Puebla players
Baseball players from Indianapolis
Billings Mustangs players
Chicago Cubs players
Columbus Clippers players
Denver Bears players
Ganaderos de Tabasco players
Gulf Coast Royals players
Jacksonville Suns players
Kansas City Royals players
Major League Baseball second basemen
Major League Baseball shortstops
Montreal Expos players
Navegantes del Magallanes players
American expatriate baseball players in Venezuela
New York Yankees players
Oakland Athletics players
Omaha Royals players
San Jose Bees players
Truchas de Toluca players
Waterloo Royals players
West Palm Beach Tropics players
Wichita Aeros players
21st-century African-American people
20th-century African-American sportspeople